Between the Species: A Journal for the Study of Philosophy and Animals (formerly Between the Species: A Journal of Ethics and Between the Species: An Online Journal for the Study of Philosophy and Animals, also known as BTS) is a peer reviewed academic journal devoted to philosophical examinations of human relationships with other animals. It is, in part, a continuation of Ethics & Animals (E&A), a journal which ran from 1980 to 1984. Between the Species was founded as a print journal in 1985, published by the Schweitzer Center of the San Francisco Bay Institute/Congress of Cultures. The print version ceased publication in 1996. It was revived as an open access online-only journal in 2002. It is published by the Philosophy Department and Digital Commons at the California Polytechnic State University; Joseph Lynch is the current editor-in-chief.

History

Print
Between the Species is the name of a fictional journal mentioned in Negavit, a novel by George Abbe. A real-world journal by the name was first published from 1971–72. This had a small distribution not extending beyond the United States, and most of its contents were works by Abbe. The journal was revived, "in modified form", in 1985, with the publication of volume 1, issue 1 of Between the Species, a quarterly scholarly journal of philosophy, also featuring interviews, artwork of various forms, and autobiographies. The journal was published by the Schweitzer Center of the San Francisco Bay Institute/Congress of Cultures with funding from the Animal Protection Institute, and was initially edited by Abbe, Steve F. Sapontzis and John Stockwell. In its early years, the journal had financial problems and issues were often released late. The editors were responsible for much of the production, which was done by hand: Stockwell explained that "In late 1984 [Sapontzis] bought a new ball for his dot-matrix printer, and dedicated part of his sabbatical year to typing out the articles that would appear in BTS. These he would print out in three inch wide continuous columns, which I would then cut with scissors and strip into pages, afterwards adding the graphics and titles." The journal was primarily distributed to readers who were themselves a part of the animal rights movement.

Between the Species is partially a continuation of a journal named Ethics & Animals. The latter publication was established in 1980 as the journal for the Society of the Study of Ethics and Animals and was edited by Harlan B. Miller. Jeanne Keister and Suzie J. Vankrey served as managing editors, while the board of directors included, at various times, Ann Cottrell Free, Theodore Sager Meth, Tom Regan, Lilly-Marlene Russow, George P. Cave, Sidney Gendin, and Steve F. Sapontzis. The journal was quarterly, and ceased publication in 1984 with issue 4 of volume 5. In his final editorial, Miller noted that mainstream philosophical journals would potentially publish ethical work on animals, and noted that readers of Ethics & Animals were specifically invited to submit manuscripts to Between the Species. The Society for the Study of Ethics and Animals says that Ethics & Animals "evolved into" Between the Species, though Between the Species is not published by the society.

Negavit, unpublished at the time of the establishment of Between the Species, began to be serialized in the third issue. The Humane Society of the United States partially funded the second volume, and the third volume received financial support from a number of "sustainers". The journal's financial difficulties were partially alleviated by a grant received from the Ahimsa Foundation prior to the publication of volume 4; this allowed the journal's expansion to 80 pages per issue. Issue 3 of volume 4 was the first issue to have professional typesetting; issues were shortened to 60 pages, but this nonetheless allowed considerably greater inclusion than the 52-page issues of volumes 1–3. Abbe died on March 15, 1989; the second issue of volume 5 was dedicated in his memory. The print journal stopped publishing in 1996 with a double issue comprising volume 12.

In 2016, the philosopher Paola Cavalieri described the initial iteration of Between the Species as "pioneering". In addition to Cavalieri, among the influential contributors to the print edition were Carol J. Adams, J. Baird Callicott, David DeGrazia, Daniel Dombrowski, Gary Francione, R. G. Frey, Marti Kheel, Charles R. Magel, Mary Midgley, Evelyn Pluhar, Tom Regan, Bernard Rollin, Holmes Rolston III, Mark Rowlands, Steve Sapontzis, Peter Singer, Richard Sylvan, Gary Varner, and Mary Anne Warren.

Online
Between the Species returned as an online-only publication in 2001, with the first issue (labelled issue 2) published in 2002; all issues published between 2002 and 2010 make up volume 13, after which it switched to single-issue volumes. The online version adopted the new name Between the Species: An Online Journal for the Study of Philosophy and Animals, and in 2010 an archive of the print journal was made available online. Volumes 15 and 16, published in 2012 and 2013 respectively, were the journal's first special issues, publishing peer-reviewed versions of selected papers from two interdisciplinary conferences in animal studies. Volume 17, published in 2014, included the journal's first interview. 2018's volume 21 was a special issue dedicated in memory of Regan, who died in 2017.

Between the Species is one of several journals that emerged in conjunction with the rise of the field of human-animal studies; others include Anthrozoös and Society & Animals. The organisation Animal Ethics describes Between the Species as a "well-known journal in animal ethics and animal philosophy"; other journals focused on philosophy and animals that the organisation identifies are the Journal of Animal Ethics, the Journal of Applied Animal Ethics Research, Relations: Beyond Anthropocentrism, and Politics and Animals. The more general Journal of Agricultural and Environmental Ethics and the defunct Ethics and Animals are also identified.

, the journal website specifies that the editor is Joseph Lynch, the editorial board is made up of Cheryl Abbate, Juliette Christie, Rob Loftis, Nathan Nobis, and Angus Taylor, and the advisory board is made up of Sapontzis, Miller, Tal Scriven and Singer. Ryan Jenkins is listed as the web editor. Authors of research articles in the online version of the journal include Richard D. Ryder, Gary L. Francione, Marti Kheel, Josephine Donovan, Lisa Kemmerer, Freya Mathews, Laurence Thomas, John Hadley, Clare Palmer, Oscar Horta, Michael Huemer, Mylan Engel Jr., and Tzachi Zamir, while other contributors include Tony Milligan, Kyle Johannsen, Mark Bernstein, Sue Donaldson, and Will Kymlicka.

See also 
 Etica & Animali
 Journal of Animal Ethics
 Relations. Beyond Anthropocentrism

References

External links
 Between the Species

Academic journals published by universities and colleges
Animal ethics journals
Animal rights mass media
Annual journals
English-language journals
Online-only journals
Open access journals
Publications established in 1985